Mangala Nayaki is a 1980 Indian Tamil-language drama film directed by Krishnan–Panju, starring Srikanth and K. R. Vijaya. The film was released on 21 March 1980. It is a remake of the Hindi film Saajan Bina Suhagan. This film also marked the acting debut on-screen of Shobana as a child artist.

Plot

Cast 
K. R. Vijaya
Sarath Babu
Srikanth
Shobana
Sivachandran
Manorama
Nisha
Srigeetha

Soundtrack 
Soundtrack was composed by V. Kumar.

References

External links 
 

1980 films
1980s Tamil-language films
1980 drama films
Films directed by Krishnan–Panju
Films scored by V. Kumar
Indian drama films
Tamil remakes of Hindi films